Marilza Martins da Silva (born 12 March 1964), commonly known as Pelézinha, is a Brazilian former football player, who operated as a forward for the Brazil women's national football team. Her nickname is an homage to the celebrated male footballer Pelé.

Early life 
Pelézinha began playing football as a youngster with the boys in her neighbourhood of Lins de Vasconcelos, north of Rio de Janeiro. She grew up as a supporter of Flamengo and admired Adílio.

Career 
In 1981, Pelézinha quit school and left América to join EC Radar on a professional basis. After playing for Radar, representing Brazil, in the 1986 edition of the Mundialito tournament in Italy, Italian clubs reportedly offered a $35,000 transfer fee to sign star player Pelézinha. She was also part of the Radar squad who went to the 1988 FIFA Women's Invitation Tournament in Guangdong as Brazil and finished in third place.

In the 1991 FIFA Women's World Cup, Pelézinha started the second group game against the United States. She was unable to make an impression against the American defense and was substituted early in the second half for 16–year–old Pretinha. Disastrous attempts to play the offside trap contributed to Brazil's 5–0 defeat to the eventual champions. Pelézinha was a reserve in the other two group games.

The Brazilian women's national team did not play another match for over three years, until a sponsorship from Maizena corn starch allowed them to play in the 1995 South American Women's Football Championship. Pelézinha was absent from the squad.

References

External links
 

1964 births
Living people
Brazilian women's footballers
1991 FIFA Women's World Cup players
Brazil women's international footballers
EC Radar players
Women's association football forwards
Footballers from Rio de Janeiro (city)